Sand Spring Presbyterian Church is a historic church in Water Valley, Mississippi.

It was built in 1854 and added to the National Register of Historic Places in 1993. The church is also registered by the Presbyterian Historical Society under the American Presbyterian/Reformed Historical Sites Registry as Site No. 371.

References

Presbyterian churches in Mississippi
Churches on the National Register of Historic Places in Mississippi
Churches completed in 1854
Lafayette County, Mississippi
National Register of Historic Places in Lafayette County, Mississippi